Russell Steven van Wyk (born 12 August 1990) is a rugby union wingerfor the Namibia national team and the  in the Currie Cup and the Rugby Challenge.
Van Wyk made his debut for the Namibia in 2015 and was part of the squad at the 2015 Rugby World Cup.

References

External links
 

1990 births
Living people
Falcons (rugby union) players
Namibia international rugby union players
Namibian rugby union players
Rugby union fullbacks
Rugby union players from Tsumeb
Rugby union wings
Welwitschias players